Veeraballi is a village in Annamayya district of the Indian state of Andhra Pradesh. It is located in Veeraballi mandal of Rajampeta revenue division.

Population
 census, there are 1847 households with a total population of 7643 in the village of Veeraballi. Out of this 3676 are females and 3967 are males.

References

Villages in Kadapa district